Muhannad Al-Ezza is a Jordanian footballer who plays for Al-Ahli.

References

External links
 
 jo.gitsport.net

Living people
Jordanian footballers
Association football midfielders
Al-Wehdat SC players
Al-Hussein SC (Irbid) players
Sahab SC players
Al-Jazeera (Jordan) players
Al-Ahli SC (Amman) players
Jordanian Pro League players
1991 births
Sportspeople from Amman
21st-century Jordanian people